This list contains notable alumni of Scottish Church College, an undergraduate and postgraduate college affiliated with the University of Calcutta, India.

Social reformers and religious leaders 
 Swami Vivekananda, Monk, philosopher, social reformer and founder of the Ramakrishna Mission.
 Rev. Lal Behari Dey, theologian of the Free Church of Scotland
 Brahmabandhav Upadhyay, theologian and preacher of New Dispensation Brahmoism, Protestantism, and Roman Catholicism
 Sitanath Tattwabhushan, theologian and former president of the Sadharan Brahmo Samaj
 Krishna Kumar Mitra, former president of the Sadharan Brahmo Samaj
 Paramahansa Yogananda, proponent of Kriya Yoga in the West and founder of the Self-Realization Fellowship
 A.C. Bhaktivedanta Swami Prabhupada, proponent of Gaudiya Vaishnavism and founder of the International Society for Krishna Consciousness
 Rev. Aurobindo Nath Mukherjee, first Indian to serve as the bishop of Calcutta and as the Metropolitan bishop of India within the Church of India, Pakistan, Burma and Ceylon
 Swami Gambhirananda, former president of the Ramakrishna Mission
 Mohanananda

Independence activists and politicians 

 Subhas Chandra Bose, former president of the Indian National Congress, founder president of the All India Forward Bloc, co-founder of the Indian National Army and head of state, Provisional Government of Free India
 Bishweshwar Prasad Koirala, first democratically elected prime minister of Nepal
 Amarendranath Chatterjee, revolutionary associated with Anushilan Samiti, and Jugantar
 Saroj Dutta, veteran communist leader, co-founder of the Communist Party of India (Marxist–Leninist) and the Naxalite movement.
 Ambica Charan Mazumdar, former president of the Indian National Congress
 Nirmal Chandra Chatterjee, former president of the All India Hindu Mahasabha
 Gopinath Bordoloi, prominent freedom fighter, first chief minister of Assam
 Prafulla Chandra Sen, former chief minister of West Bengal
 Yangmasho Shaiza, former chief minister of Manipur
 Brington Buhai Lyngdoh, former chief minister of Meghalaya
 S.C. Marak, former chief minister of Meghalaya
 S.C. Jamir, former chief minister of Nagaland, former governor of Maharashtra, Gujarat and Goa, and governor of Odisha
 Rishang Keishing, former chief minister of Manipur
 George Gilbert Swell, former deputy speaker of the Lok Sabha and former ambassador to Norway and Burma
 Birendra Narayan Chakraborty, former governor of Haryana
 Banwari Lal Joshi, former governor of Uttar Pradesh, Delhi, Meghalaya and Uttarakhand
 Ajit Kumar Panja, former minister of state for external affairs
 Shawkat Ali Khan, a framer of the Constitution of Bangladesh

Jurists 

 Sir Gooroodas Banerjee, former judge at the Calcutta High Court
 Sudhi Ranjan Das, former Chief Justice of India
 Amal Kumar Sarkar, former Chief Justice of India
 Subimal Chandra Roy, former judge of the Supreme Court of India
 Sambhunath Banerjee, former judge of the Calcutta High Court
 Amarendra Nath Sen, former chief justice of the Calcutta High Court, and former judge of the Supreme Court of India
 Samarendra Chandra Deb, former chief justice of the Calcutta High Court
 Anil Kumar Sen, former chief justice of the Calcutta High Court
 Anandamoy Bhattacharjee, former chief justice of the Sikkim, Calcutta and the Bombay High Courts
 Ganendra Narayan Ray, former chief justice of the Gujarat High Court, and former judge of the Supreme Court of India
 Umesh Chandra Banerjee, former chief justice of the Andhra Pradesh High Court and former judge of the Supreme Court of India
 Mukul Gopal Mukherjee, former chief justice of the Rajasthan High Court
 Shyamal Kumar Sen, former chief justice of the Allahabad High Court, and former governor of West Bengal

Scholars and academic administrators 

 Chandramukhi Basu, one of the first female graduates of the British Empire, and the first female head of an undergraduate college in South Asia (as principal of Bethune College, Calcutta)
 Sir Gooroodas Banerjee, first Indian vice chancellor of the University of Calcutta
 Sir Brajendra Nath Seal, first chancellor of Visva-Bharati University, former vice chancellor of the University of Mysore
 Sir Jnan Chandra Ghosh, formerly director of the Indian Institute of Science, Bangalore, founder-director of the Indian Institute of Technology Kharagpur and former vice chancellor of the University of Calcutta
 Tarak Nath Das, formerly professor of political science at Columbia University
 Sarat Chandra Roy, pioneering anthropologist, often regarded as the father of Indian ethnography, and as the first Indian anthropologist
 Biraja Sankar Guha, pioneering anthropologist, one of the first PhD recipients in anthropology in the world (Harvard University, 1924) and founder-director of the Anthropological Survey of India
 Nirmal Kumar Bose, eminent anthropologist and freedom fighter
 Ramaprasad Chanda, anthropologist and archaeologist
 Hem Chandra Raychaudhuri, formerly Carmichael Professor of Ancient Indian History and Culture, University of Calcutta
 Kalidas Nag, historian, author and parliamentarian
 Kaliprasanna Vidyaratna, Sanskrit scholar, author and academician
 Tapan Raychaudhuri, ad hominem professor of Indian history and civilization and emeritus fellow, St Antony's College, Oxford
 Rabindra Kumar Das Gupta, formerly Tagore professor of Bengali literature, University of Delhi, and former director of the National Library of India
 Asima Chatterjee, first Indian woman to earn a doctorate in science, first female recipient of the Shanti Swarup Bhatnagar Prize for Science and Technology, and first female president of the Indian Science Congress
 Animesh Chakravorty, recipient of the Shanti Swarup Bhatnagar Prize for Science and Technology in chemistry, formerly chair of the department of chemistry, Indian Institute of Technology Kanpur
 Sambhunath Banerjee, Nirmal Kumar Sidhanta, Ramendra Kumar Podder, and Santosh Bhattacharyya, former vice chancellors of the University of Calcutta
 Nityananda Saha, former vice chancellor of the University of Kalyani
 Purabi Roy, noted scholar, author and Netaji researcher

Performing arts, theater and cinema 

 Sisir Bhaduri, noted playwright
 Pankaj Mullick, Bollywood and Bengali cinema music director and composer
 Birendra Krishna Bhadra, broadcaster, playwright, and theater director
 Suchitra Mitra, Rabindra Sangeet exponent
 Manna Dey, Bollywood film music exponent
 Mrinal Sen, internationally acclaimed art film director and cultural commentator
 Buddhadeb Dasgupta, noted parallel cinema director and poet
 Tarun Majumdar, film director. the Government of India honoured him with the Padma Shri.
 Utpalendu Chakrabarty, film director and thespian
 Mithun Chakraborty, Bollywood action hero and social activist
 Shyamanand Jalan, thespian and theatre director
 Kaushik Sen, noted theatre personality, director of Swapnasandhani theatre group
 Silajit Majumder, singer and actor
 Badal Sircar, dramatist
 Rudraprasad Sengupta, eminent theatre personality, director of Nandikar theatre group and cultural critic
 Partha Pratim Chowdhury, film director and playwright
 Manoj Mitra, dramatist
 Madhav Sharma, actor, comedian, theater director
 Pulak Bandyopadhyay, lyricist and composer
 Puja Banerjee , actress
 Tridha Choudhury, actress
Padmanabha Dasgupta, Screenplay Writer,actor.
 Sailajaranjan Majumdar, distinguised exponent and teacher of Rabindrasangeet.
 Anamika Saha, actress

Writers, poets and journalists 

 Dhan Gopal Mukerji, socio-cultural critic and first successful Indian man of letters in the United States of America; winner of Newbery Medal (1928)
 Nirad C. Chaudhuri, polymath, historian and commentator on culture, and Commander of the Order of the British Empire
 Ajit Kumar Chakravarty, translator and critic
 Satyendranath Dutta, poet
 Sudhindranath Dutta, author and poet
 Ashok Kumar Sarkar, former editor of Desh literary magazine and editor-in-chief of the Anandabazar Patrika (1958–1983)
 Lakshminath Bezbaroa, writer, editor and social critic
 Parvati Prasad Baruwa, litterateur
 Premendra Mitra, novelist, short story and science fiction writer, and film director
 Subhas Mukhopadhyay, poet
 Samaresh Majumdar, novelist
 Sajanikanta Das, critic, poet and editor of Shanibarer Chithi
 Sanjib Chattopadhyay, journalist, author and critic
 Bani Basu, essayist, novelist, and poet
 Kanhaiyalal Sethia, poet
 Kali Nath Roy, editor in chief of The Tribune magazine
 Farrukh Ahmed, poet, writer, activist of the Language Movement
 Derek O'Brien, quiz-master and author
 Bina Sarkar Ellias, poet, fiction writer, art curator & founder-editor and publisher of International Gallerie, a global arts and ideas magazine
 Mustafa Manwar, artist and media personality
 Madhu Rye, playwright, novelist and short story writer

Administrators and organization leaders 

 Binay Ranjan Sen, former director general of the Food and Agriculture Organization (1956–1967)
 Nitish Chandra Laharry, first Indian (and Asian) president of Rotary International (1962–63)
 Jagmohan Dalmiya, former president of the Board of Control for Cricket in India and the first Indian chairman of the International Cricket Council
 Mani Lal Bhaumik, scientist (laser technology) turned entrepreneur, inventor of the excimer laser and author
 Diptendu Pramanick, first secretary of the Eastern India Motion Pictures Association, and secretary of the Film Federation of India (1953–54)
 Evelyn Norah Shullai, pioneer of the Girl Guides Movement in India

Sportspersons 

 Gourgopal Ghosh, football player for the Mohun Bagan club and mathematician
 Dharma Bhakta Mathema, bodybuilder, political activist and anti-royalist martyr in the Kingdom of Nepal
 Surya Shekhar Ganguly, chess grandmaster and national champion
 Sreerupa Bose, former member, India national women's cricket team

Industrialists, businessmen and philanthropists
 Rameshwarlall Daulatram Nopany - founder of Nopany group based in Calcutta and a philanthropist
 Samson H. Chowdhury - Industrialist

References 

Scottish Church College